is a retired male medley swimmer from Japan, who represented his native country at the 1996 Summer Olympics in Atlanta, Georgia. He is best known for winning the silver medal in the Men's 200m Individual Medley at the 1995 Summer Universiade in Fukuoka, behind America's Tom Wilkens.

References
  sports-reference

1970 births
Living people
Japanese male medley swimmers
Olympic swimmers of Japan
Swimmers at the 1996 Summer Olympics
Asian Games medalists in swimming
Universiade medalists in swimming
Asian Games silver medalists for Japan
Swimmers at the 1998 Asian Games
Medalists at the 1998 Asian Games
Universiade silver medalists for Japan
Medalists at the 1995 Summer Universiade
20th-century Japanese people